San Antonio del Sur is a municipality and town in the Guantánamo Province of Cuba. It is located on the southern coast of Cuba, bordering the Windward Passage to the south.

Demographics
In 2004, the municipality of San Antonio del Sur had a population of 26,509.

See also
List of cities in Cuba
Municipalities of Cuba

References

External links

Populated places in Guantánamo Province